Several ships have been named Otter for the marine mammal otter:

 was a maritime fur trading vessel. Between 1795 and 1798 it visited the Pacific. It was most famous for the rescue of Thomas Muir, a famous Scottish political exile.
 was launched at Liverpool, initially as a West Indiaman. She made seven voyages as a slave ship and was lost in 1807 on her way back to Britain from her seventh slave voyage. 
 was launched in America in 1799. She appeared in the Register of Shipping in 1809, after she had already made the first of three voyages as a whaler. She then started trading with the Mediterranean where the French captured her in 1813.

See also
, one of several ships of the British Royal Navy
HMQS Otter, a patrol and examination vessel of the Queensland Maritime Defence Force, and later the Royal Australian Navy
USS Otter (DE-210), a destroyer escort of the United States Navy
 The Voyage of the otter, 1795–1797

Ship names